Thysanotus patersonii, the twining fringe-lily, is a climbing perennial herb which is endemic to  Australia.

Description 
Tuberous and leafless, growing to between 0.15 and 0.5 metres in height.  They produce purple flowers between July and November in its native range.

Basal leaves disappear as the plant matures. 
They ascend through the surrounding canopy by spiralling around nearby plants to attain a height between 0.6 and 0.8 metres.

Taxonomy 
The species was first described by the botanist Robert Brown.

Distribution
Thysanotus patersonii occurs across southern Australian states, excluding Queensland and the Northern Territory. New South Wales flora online states that it is found in Queensland and the Northern Territory and the electronic flora of South Australia excludes only the Northern Territory.

Ecology
Strips of this plant are used by the red-eared firetail Stagonopleura oculata, a small bird in Southwest Australia, in the construction of their elaborate nests.

The plant is used in urban landscapes and gardens, especially as a rockery specimen. It is grown from seed, favouring full sun and free drainage, and will trail out from rocks or loosely spiral up on neighbouring plants. Flowers are prolific and appear over spring and summer.

References

Asparagales of Australia
Flora of New South Wales
Flora of South Australia
Flora of Tasmania
Flora of Victoria (Australia)
Angiosperms of Western Australia
Lomandroideae